Cacoecimorpha is a monotypic moth genus of the family Tortricidae. Cacoecimorpha pronubana—the carnation tortrix—is its sole species and is found in Europe, northern Africa, South Africa, Anatolia and North America.

The wingspan is 18–22 mm for females and 15–17 mm for males. The forewings ground colour is light reddish ochreous with darker lines. The forewing costa is rounded. The hindwings are bright orange. Julius von Kennel provides a full description. 

Adults are on wing from May to June and again from August to September depending on the location.

The larvae feed on a wide variety of deciduous trees, shrubs and herbaceous plants. It can become a pest on olive trees and avocados.

References

External links
Arthropods of Economic Importance
Lepidoptera of Belgium
Microlepidoptera.nl 
Cacoecimorpha at funet
UKmoths

Archipini
Tortricidae genera
Monotypic moth genera
Moths described in 1799
Moths of Africa
Moths of Asia
Tortricidae of Europe
Moths of North America

Taxa named by Jacob Hübner